Oklahoma City is the capital and largest city of the U.S. state of Oklahoma. 

Oklahoma City may also refer to: 

Oklahoma City metropolitan area
Downtown Oklahoma City
Uptown Oklahoma City
Oklahoma City University
 , the name of two U.S. Navy vessels

See also
 
 List of cities and towns in Oklahoma
 Oklahoma (disambiguation)
 OKC (disambiguation)
 OC (disambiguation)